Kunjali Marakkar is a 1967 Indian Malayalam-language historical film directed by S. S. Rajan, written by K. Padmanabhan Nair and produced by T. K. Pareekutty. It stars Kottarakkara Sreedharan Nair, Prem Nazir, Sukumari, P. K. Saraswathi and P. K. Sathyapal. The film has a musical score by B. A. Chidambaranath. The film won the National Film Award for Best Feature Film in Malayalam.

Cast

Prem Nazir as Antonio / Narayana Nair
Sukumari
P. K. Saraswathi
P. K. Sathyapal
P. J. Antony as Zamorin's nephew
Jyothi Lakshmi
Kottarakkara Sreedharan Nair as Kunjali Marakkar, Chief Naval Officer of Samoothiri
Kunjava
Kuthiravattam Pappu
Kuttyedathi Vilasini
Premji as Zamorin of Calicut
Santha Devi

Soundtrack
The music was composed by B. A. Chidambaranath and the lyrics were written by P. Bhaskaran.

References

External links
 

1967 films
1960s Malayalam-language films
Indian biographical films
History of Kerala on film
Films shot in Kozhikode
Films shot in Kannur
Best Malayalam Feature Film National Film Award winners
1960s biographical films